Sara Price (born September 2, 1992) is an American racing driver, having competed in motocross, rallying, the X Games, Stadium Super Trucks and Extreme E. She currently races in Extreme E for Chip Ganassi Racing.

Price has won 17 national motocross championships and she has medaled in the X Games. She hails from Southern California and has been racing since the age of 8.

Racing career
In 2010, Price became first female factory supported motocross racer to race for Monster Energy Kawasaki Racing. Over the next few years, Price raced for Monster Energy Kawasaki and medaled several times at the X Games before transitioning to racing off road. Price placed first at the 2013 Elsinore Grand Prix and won the Terracross Championship in 2015.

In 2016, Price won the Off-road Motorsports Hall of Fame Rising Star Award in the UTV, MX, and ATV Category.
 
Price made her debut in Stadium Super Trucks at the 2016 Honda Indy Toronto race weekend, becoming the first female driver to compete in the series. The following year, she ran the season finale at Lake Elsinore Diamond. Price did not return to the series until 2020, racing at the Adelaide 500 race weekend.

In 2017, Price won Hoonigan and Fiat's Female Driver Search to become next female Hoonigan Athlete. She also placed 6th place at the Climb to the Clouds” at Mount Washington in a Fiat 124 Rally Car.

Price made her debut in a trophy truck in the 2017 Best in the Desert Laughlin Desert Classic and placed second.

In 2019, Price became the first female SCORE International Baja 1000 IronWoman by solo driving the entire race and finishing second in the trophy trucks spec class.

Price first raced rally in 2015 Rallye Aicha des Gazelles, finishing first among rookie participants. Price did not return to rally racing until 2020 when she placed second in the UTV Class at Sonora Rally.

On June 11, 2020, Chip Ganassi Racing announced Price would race with the team for the inaugural Extreme E season in 2021. She was the first confirmed driver for the series, and the first female racer in CGR's history.

Miss California USA
Price competed in the Miss California USA beauty pageant in 2013, but did not make the finals.

Motorsports career results

Stadium Super Trucks
(key) (Bold – Pole position. Italics – Fastest qualifier. * – Most laps led.)

 Standings were not recorded by the series for the 2020 season.

Extreme E
(key)

* Season still in progress.

Filmography

References

External links
 
 

Living people
American motocross riders
Stadium Super Trucks drivers
X Games athletes
1992 births
American female racing drivers
21st-century American women
Extreme E drivers
Chip Ganassi Racing drivers